Eudora OSE (Open Source Edition), formerly codenamed Penelope, is an extension for the Mozilla Thunderbird email client software implementing some features of Eudora.

History
On October 11, 2006, QUALCOMM Incorporated and the Mozilla Foundation announced future versions of Eudora would be based on the Mozilla Thunderbird platform and be open-source. The codename for this project is "Penelope," with that name being used for the extension provided for Thunderbird, and the Eudora name kept for all-in-one releases packaged and released by the Eudora development team.

Development began with the first patch being submitted to Bugzilla on November 22, 2006.

Further development of Penelope and Eudora continued, with the first beta version of Eudora 8.0 released on August 31, 2007; the most current releases, Eudora 8.0b9 and Penelope 1.0b1, were released on March 4, 2010.

On July 2, 2010, the name was changed to Eudora OSE (Open Source Edition) and the version number was reset to 1.0 when it was released.  From the beta 1.0 release candidate 1 readme.txt:

Beta versions of Eudora OSE were originally named just Eudora with a version number of 8.0.  This caused some confusion in that some users expected the new version to be a regular update to Classic Eudora.  Since Eudora OSE uses an entirely different code base from Classic Eudora, in an effort to reduce the confusion the application was renamed to Eudora OSE (Open Source Edition). The version number was also reset to 1.0, which has the added benefit that it is synchronized with the Penelope version number.

Eudora OSE does not retain the original mbox data structure, which stores all attachments as individual files together in one folder. It uses the same modern mbox file used by Apple Mail and others. No software is currently developed/supported that can access old Eudora mail archives directly, without import/conversion.

Many Eudora users disliked the direction Penelope took. Similarly, reception to Eudora OSE continued to be lukewarm months after the release. The intended updates, to be released in parallel with new Thunderbird releases, have not materialized and continue to lead to frustration and disappointment in the Eudora community.

On June 28, 2013, the Mozilla website indicated that Eudora OSE is based on an out-of-date version of Thunderbird and that, to Mozilla's knowledge, Qualcomm has no plans to update or support it. Mozilla recommends current users consider switching to Thunderbird.

Release history

See also 

Comparison of email clients
Eudora (email client)

References

External links
Mozilla Wiki pages:
 Penelope / (archived page) / (Talk)
 Eudora Releases / (Talk)

 Eudora OSE / (Talk)
 Eudora Documentation Project / (Talk)

 Eudora source code at the Computer History Museum

Email clients
Mozilla Thunderbird
Qualcomm software